Colton Thomas Herta (born March 30, 2000) is an American open-wheel racing driver currently competing in the NTT IndyCar Series for Andretti Autosport with Curb-Agajanian. He is the youngest person to ever win an IndyCar Series race.

He is the son of IndyCar and Champ Car driver Bryan Herta.

Early years

Karting
Herta made his karting debut in 2010 at the age of 10, racing karts in the SKUSA and IKF series, although he had been karting since the age of 6. He made his single debut at 13, finishing second in the SBF2000 Winter Series. In 2014, he made his formula car debut in the Cooper Tires USF2000 Championship Powered by Mazda, finishing 15th in the championship despite missing the opening weekend due to age requirements. In the same year, Herta made his International Formula racing debut in Sepang, Malaysia with the AsiaCup Series, taking part in one event where he won 1 race win and 3 podium finishes.  Herta also made a one-off appearance in the Global RallyCross Championship Lites, being the youngest driver to compete in the series.

Racing in Europe
In 2015, he made his debut in the UK-based MSA Formula series, as the youngest driver and the only American on a grid that consisted mostly of Britons, and got his first win in the second race at Snetterton Circuit in August, thus helping the United States win the Nations Cup. He went on to collect three more victories throughout the season, finishing third overall.

For 2016, he was planning to move to the newly renamed BRDC British F3 series but was too young to compete at the opening round. Wanting to complete a full season he made the switch to the Euroformula Open Championship, staying with Carlin and finished third in points, with four victories, six podium finishes, and five pole positions. Herta went on to compete in six British F3 events, earning three podium finishes including a victory at Brands Hatch.

Indy Lights
In 2017 Herta joined forces with the newly formed Andretti-Steinbrenner Racing to pilot the 98-car in the Indy Lights Series. He started the year strong with a second-place finish in the first race at St. Petersburg street circuit and followed it up with a Sunday victory; Colton's first win in Indy Lights. He got his 2nd victory at the next event at Barber Motorsports Park, the series' 400th race. Herta won Rookie of the Year and finished 3rd in the drivers championship.

In 2018, Herta remained in Indy Lights. He won four races, including all three held at Indianapolis Motor Speedway (both races of the GP of Indianapolis and the Freedom 100 on the speedway). Herta finished 2nd in points to his Andretti teammate Patricio O'Ward.

IndyCar

Also in 2018, Herta debuted in IndyCar at the season finale in Sonoma with Harding Racing.

Harding Steinbrenner Racing

2019: Rookie Season
For the 2019 IndyCar season, Herta signed to drive the No. 88 Harding Steinbrenner Racing car. Herta was the first IndyCar Series driver born in the 2000s to start a race. On March 24, 2019, at the age of 18, Herta became the youngest-ever winner in IndyCar history by winning the IndyCar Classic at Circuit of the Americas. He qualified 5th for the Indianapolis 500, but retired after just four laps after a gearbox failure. On June 22, 2019, at the age of 19, Herta became the youngest-ever pole-sitter at Road America. He won again at Laguna Seca, and finished 7th in the overall standings, just 5 points behind Rookie of the Year Felix Rosenqvist.

Andretti Autosport

2020: Sophomore Season 
Herta again drove the #88 car for Harding Steinbrenner Racing in 2020, with additional backing from Andretti Autosport. Herta finished 7th in the opening round of the 2020 IndyCar season at Texas Motor Speedway. He finished 8th at the Indianapolis 500. On September 13, 2020, Herta won the second of two races held at Mid-Ohio. He scored a runner-up finish at the Indianapolis road course's Saturday race. With seven top 5s in 14 races, he ranked third in points.

2021: Three More Wins 
Going into 2021, Herta was seen as the strongest challenger in the Andretti stable to Scott Dixon for the IndyCar title. For 2021 Herta would move from the #88 Andretti Harding Steinbrenner Racing car to the #26 Andretti Autosport with Curb Agajanian car with backing from Indianapolis 500 title sponsor Gainbridge. Herta started his season caught up in an accident caused by Josef Newgarden in Alabama but earned his first win of the season at St. Petersburg, his first win on a street circuit. The rest of the season proved to be a struggle for Herta. He would only secure two podium finishes before his second win of the season; a second-place at Road America and third place at the second round on the IMS Road Course. He was frequently beset by poor strategy, mechanical issues, and driving errors. Most notable of these was at the inaugural round in Nashville; Herta would qualify on pole position for the race, lead most of the race, lost the lead under caution to Marcus Ericsson, and crashed out of the race attempting to take the lead back from Ericsson in the closing laps. Herta would pick up his second win of the season at Laguna Seca, where he led all but one lap of the race to win from pole. He finished the season off with a come from behind victory on The Streets of Long Beach when he started fourteenth and worked his way rapidly through the field to take the lead from Josef Newgarden and Scott Dixon to win his third race of the season. He ultimately finished the season fifth in the championship standings.

2022: A Difficult Season 
After intense speculation that he would be making a move to Formula One, Andretti Autosport and Herta announced that he would be racing in IndyCar in 2022, partnering Alexander Rossi, Romain Grosjean, and Devlin DeFrancesco. Herta struggled in the initial rounds of the season, including crashing after losing the lead at Long Beach, but picked up his first win of the season at the GMR Grand Prix.

2023 
Herta initially signed a multi-year contract to remain with Andretti Autosport, though this would be later to be extended to 2027.

Sports car racing
Herta participated in the 2019 24 Hours of Daytona in a BMW M8 GTE for Rahal Letterman Lanigan Racing in the WeatherTech SportsCar Championship. He, along with co-drivers Connor De Phillippi, Augusto Farfus and Philipp Eng, won the race in the GTLM class. 

Herta returned to Daytona participate in the 2022 edition, partnering fellow IndyCar drivers Pato O'Ward and Devlin DeFrancesco along with Eric Lux in an LMP2 entry for DragonSpeed. The quartet won after Herta took the lead in the final 11 minutes of the race.

In late 2022 Herta was confirmed as one of the drivers for the new BMW M Hybrid V8 prototype to be fielded by Rahal Letterman Lannigan racing during the 2023 IMSA SportsCar Championship.

Formula One 
With the attempted purchase of Sauber by Andretti Autosport, Herta was the favorite candidate to join Formula One with Alfa Romeo for the 2022 season partnering Valtteri Bottas. He got to mold the seat and do a test with the simulator at the team's base in Hinwil, Switzerland, where according to multiple reports and Mario Andretti, he set faster times than Kimi Räikkönen and Antonio Giovinazzi, then Alfa Romeo's lineup. A preliminary agreement was reached with Ferrari to hold a 300 km test with a Formula One car so that Herta could participate in free practice in the United States, Mexico City and Sao Paulo Grand Prix. However, those tests never happened and the negotiations between Andretti and Sauber broke down at the end of 2021, the purchase never took place and Alfa Romeo signed Zhou Guanyu for 2022.

In March 2022, Herta was signed by McLaren as a development driver in the 2022 season to test the MCL35M from 2021. He took part in his first test drive from 11–13 July around Algarve International Circuit in Portimão, which results have said to have "seriously impressed" industry insiders.

In 2022, Red Bull began to show interest in having Herta as an AlphaTauri driver for 2023. Herta however lacked enough points to obtain a super license, which is necessary to be able to contest in Formula One. Red Bull began efforts to obtain it by asking the FIA ​​to consider making an exception for Herta. Red Bull reached an agreement with Alpine for Herta to be included in the tests with its Formula One cars in September in Hungary, which the French team was organizing to choose its driver in 2023. Alpine would accept, so that Herta could get some extra points in his super license and that the AlphaTauri driver, Pierre Gasly, was free to join the French team. Ultimately the FIA's refused to make an exception for Herta, Red Bull would abandon its efforts to bring the American driver to Formula One and Herta did not participate in the tests with Alpine.

Personal life
Herta plays the drums and is a member of indie punk rock band The Zibs, which he formed in 2018 with his high school friends Jon Graber and Chris Broadbent.

Racing record

Career summary

* Season still in progress.

Complete Euroformula Open Championship results 
(key) (Races in bold indicate pole position; races in italics indicate points for the fastest lap of top ten finishers)

American open-wheel racing results

U.S. F2000 National Championship

Indy Lights

IndyCar Series
(key)

Indianapolis 500

Complete IMSA SportsCar Championship results
(key) (Races in bold indicate pole position; races in italics indicate fastest lap)

† Points only counted towards the Michelin Endurance Cup, and not the overall LMP2 Championship.
* Season still in progress.

References

External links
 

2000 births
Living people
Sportspeople from Santa Clarita, California
People from Valencia, Santa Clarita, California
Racing drivers from California
International Kart Federation drivers
U.S. F2000 National Championship drivers
Euroformula Open Championship drivers
British F4 Championship drivers
BRDC British Formula 3 Championship drivers
Indy Lights drivers
IndyCar Series drivers
24 Hours of Daytona drivers
Indianapolis 500 drivers
Carlin racing drivers
Harding Steinbrenner Racing drivers
Andretti Autosport drivers
WeatherTech SportsCar Championship drivers
Global RallyCross Championship drivers
Rahal Letterman Lanigan Racing drivers
DragonSpeed drivers
BMW M drivers